The Storm Book is a 1952 picture book written by Charlotte Zolotow and illustrated by Margaret Bloy Graham. The book tells the story of a summer storm from the perspective of a young boy. The book was a recipient of a 1953 Caldecott Honor for its illustrations.

References

1952 children's books
American picture books
Caldecott Honor-winning works